George Leckie Sinclair (12 December 1884 – 18 December 1959) was a Scottish footballer who played for Leith Athletic, Heart of Midlothian, Dunfermline Athletic, Cowdenbeath and Scotland.

Career

Club
A traditional outside right (winger), Sinclair had been a soldier in his teenage years before joining Leith in 1906; he signed for Hearts at the end of the 1907–08 season. He made 192 appearances for the Tynecastle Park club in the Scottish Football League and Scottish Cup prior to the outbreak of World War I. As a reservist, Sinclair had pledged to join up and was one of the first to leave Hearts to go off to the war in August 1914 (later the whole squad enlisted – the first British club to do so; most of the players were with "C" Company of the Royal Scots – Sir George McCrae's Battalion).

Sinclair served with the Royal Field Artillery, saw action at the Battle of Mons and was injured in 1915, but survived the war and returned to play for Hearts again, along with Paddy Crossan and Bob Mercer. In 1919 the club reached the final of the Victory Cup. He made 162 further appearances for the club in the two major competitions.

Sinclair continued to play football into the 1920s, including a spell in the United States.

International
He won three Scotland caps prior to WWI and also played for the Scottish Football League XI twice, either side of the conflict.

Later life
He went on to run Sinclair's Bar in Montrose Terrace at Abbeyhill until he died in 1959.

References

External links 
 

1884 births
1959 deaths
Scottish footballers
Scotland international footballers
Leith Athletic F.C. players
Heart of Midlothian F.C. players
Dunfermline Athletic F.C. players
Cowdenbeath F.C. players
Scottish Football League players
Scottish Football League representative players
Association football outside forwards
Footballers from Edinburgh
British Army personnel of World War I
Royal Field Artillery soldiers
Scottish soldiers